The Hebbel am Ufer (HAU) is a theater and international performance center based in Berlin. It was founded by combining three theaters in Kreuzberg, Berlin: Hebbel Theater (now called HAU1), Theater am Halleschen Ufer (theater at Hallesches Ufer) (now called HAU2) and Theater am Ufer (now called HAU3).

Annemie Vanackere has been its artistic director since 2012. Its founding director was Matthias Lilienthal, who also invented the international best-selling theater project "X Homes" (also known as "X Apartments").

The Hebbel am Ufer is funded with 4 million euros by the State of Berlin and various foundations and organizations in Berlin as well as in the rest of Germany. Its mission is to protect and support the tradition of the Hebbel Theater, which is to provide space and infrastructure for different international and national theater, dance and performance events.

The HAU is known for international productions in various performing arts. Especially for younger generations of theater enthusiasts, HAU has become an important part of the cultural life in Germany.

Artists (examples) 
Peaches, Gob Squad, Jérôme Bel, Neco Çelik, Big Art Group, Alvis Hermanis, Şermin Langhoff, Constanza Macras, Richard Maxwell, Xavier Leroy, Norton.Commander.Productions, Rimini Protokoll, Jochen Roller, Christoph Schlingensief, She She Pop, The Wooster Group, Baktruppen, alexandliane, newfrontears.

External links 
 HAU Official website

Theatres in Berlin